Mark F. Jarman  (born in Mount Sterling, Kentucky) is an American poet and critic often identified with the New Narrative branch of the New Formalism; he was co-editor with Robert McDowell of The Reaper throughout the 1980s.  Centennial Professor of English, Emeritus, at Vanderbilt University, he is the author of eleven books of poetry, three books of essays, and a book of essays co-authored with Robert McDowell.  He co-edited the anthology Rebel Angels: 25 Poets of the New Formalism with David Mason.

Jarman's awards for poetry include a Joseph Henry Jackson Award, three grants from the NEA, and a fellowship from the John Simon Guggenheim Foundation.  His book The Black Riviera won the 1991 Poets' Prize.  Questions for Ecclesiastes was a finalist for the 1997 National Book Critics Circle Award in poetry and won the 1998 Lenore Marshall Poetry Prize from the Academy of American Poets and The Nation magazine. Bone Fires: New and Selected Poems won the 2013 Balcones Prize.

Biography
Mark Jarman was born while his father, Donald R. Jarman, was in seminary in Lexington, Kentucky. His parents, both Californians, moved back to California in 1954 and settled in Santa Maria, where his father served First Christian Church.  In 1958, responding to a call from his denomination, Mark's father moved his wife Bo Dee, his son, and daughter Katie, to Scotland to serve a small church in Kirkcaldy, Fife, a linoleum factory town on the Firth of Forth across from Edinburgh.  The three years he spent there were formative ones for the poet.  The family returned to California in 1961, where his father served South Bay Christian Church in Redondo Beach and his sister Luanne was born.  In 1970, Jarman entered the University of California at Santa Cruz and earned a B.A. with highest honors in English literature in 1974.  There he met his wife, soprano Amy Kane Jarman and his friend and long-time collaborator, Robert McDowell.  While at U.C.S.C., he studied with the poet and editor George Hitchcock (poet) and the short story writer and poet Raymond Carver.    In 1974, Jarman entered the Iowa Writers' Workshop and earned an M.F.A. in poetry in 1976. At Iowa he studied with Donald Justice, Charles Wright, Stanley Plumly, and Sandra McPherson.  His classmates included poets Chase Twichell, Brenda Hillman, James Galvin, and Rita Dove.  In 1976, he was hired to teach creative writing at Indiana State University in Evansville.  In 1978, a grant from the National Endowment for the Arts allowed him to quit his job and live in Italy where Amy studied singing in Perugia.  Returning to California in 1979, he was hired as a visiting writer at the University of California at Irvine.  Mark and Amy's oldest daughter was born in Mission Viejo in 1980.  That same year, Jarman took a position teaching creative writing at Murray State University in Kentucky.  Two years later the couple's second daughter was born in Murray.  In 1983, he left Murray State to teach at Vanderbilt University, where he has been since.  Amy joined the voice faculty at the Blair School of Music in 1986.  Since 2007, Jarman has been Centennial Professor of English at Vanderbilt and was Director of Creative Writing until 2013. In August 2020, he retired from Vanderbilt University and is now Centennial Professor of English Emeritus.

Jarman's early poetry reflects the influence of living by the Pacific and the North Sea at important times in his life, along with growing up in a strongly religious family.  As he has matured, his poetry has remained invested in family experience, a sense of place, and the presence of God in everyday life.  Though he is associated with the New Formalism, his poetry has always ranged widely in form and style, from narrative to lyric, free to metrical verse, verse to prose poetry.

Honors
  Balcones Poetry Prize, 2013
  Lenore Marshall Poetry Prize of the Academy of American Poets, 1998
  Finalist, National Book Critics Circle Award, 1997, for poetry
  National Endowment for the Arts Grant, 1992, for poetry
  The Poets' Prize, 1991
  Guggenheim Fellow (Poetry), 1991–92
  Robert Frost Fellowship in poetry, The Bread Loaf Writers' Conference, 1985
  Crazyhorse prize for poetry published in the journal during the past year, 1985
  National Endowment for the Arts Grant, 1984, for poetry
  Duncan Lawrie Prize, Sotheby's International Poetry Competition, 1982
  National Endowment for the Arts Grant, 1977, for poetry
  Academy of American Poets Prize, 1975, The University of Iowa
  The Joseph Henry Jackson Award, 1974, from the San Francisco Foundation, for a manuscript  of poetry

Works
North Sea, Cleveland State University Poetry Center, 1978,  
The Rote Walker, Carnegie-Mellon University Press, 1981,  
Far and Away, Carnegie-Mellon University Press, 1985,  
 
Iris, Story Line Press, 1992,  
Questions for Ecclesiastes, Story Line Press, 1997,  
Unholy Sonnets, Story Line Press, 2000,  
To the Green Man, Sarabande Books, 2004,  
Epistles, Sarabande Books, 2007,  
Bone Fires: New and Selected Poems, Sarabande Books, 2011,  
The Heronry, Sarabande Books, 2017, 
Zeno's Eternity, Paul Dry Books, 2023,

Non-fiction
The Reaper Essays, written with Robert McDowell (Story Line Press, 1996)
Rebel Angels: 25 Poets of the New Formalism, (editor, with David Mason) (Story Line Press 1996)
The Secret of Poetry, Story Line Press, 2001,  
Body and Soul: Essays on Poetry, University of Michigan Press, 2002, 
Dailiness:Essays on Poetry, Paul Dry Books, 2020,

Notes

References
  Flynn, Richard.  "Mark Jarman." Dictionary of Literary Biography, Volume 120:  American Poets Since World War II, Third Series.  Ed. R.S. Gwynn. Gale Research, 1992.
  Newberry, Jeff.  "Mark Jarman."  Facts on File Companion to 20th Century American Poetry.  Ed. Burt Kimmelman.  Facts on File, 2005.

External links
Poet of the Month (website curated by Mark Jarman, 1997–2007)
Academy of American Poets entry
Author note at Ploughshares
Author note at Poetry Foundation
 (website for Mark Jarman)

Living people
1952 births
American male poets
Iowa Writers' Workshop alumni
University of California, Santa Cruz alumni
People from Mount Sterling, Kentucky
University of California, Irvine faculty
University of Southern Indiana faculty
Murray State University faculty
Vanderbilt University faculty